The series Danny Phantom centers on young Danny Fenton and his coming-of-age story as a half-ghost superhero in the town of Amity Park. Over the course of the series, he betters both himself and his powers as he deals with ghosts, balancing his normal and heroic life in a community that does not initially trust him.

His companions are his best friends: Sam Manson, a vegetarian  goth girl who is entranced by the "weird and supernatural" and Tucker Foley, a lighthearted "techno-geek". Danny often has to put up with the eccentricity of his ghost-hunting parents, Jack and Maddie Fenton, and his smothering, doting, but compassionate older sister, Jazz Fenton. His primary nemesis is Vlad Masters, a billionaire celebrity who is also a half-ghost.

Main

Danny Phantom

Daniel William "Danny" Fenton, also known as Danny Phantom, is the main protagonist of the series. He is initially shown as an average, self-conscious, introverted, kind-hearted, and sensitive 14-year-old boy who is desperate to fit in with his peers and be accepted, despite his parents' eccentrics. Danny thinks highly of his older sister Jazz, despite finding it annoying when she gets involved in his social life, and is in many ways as over-protective of her as she is of him. After an accident in his parents' ghost lab, Danny becomes a human/ghost hybrid, also called a half-ghost or halfa, and obtains a variety of ghostly abilities. A battle with the Lunch Lady Ghost places the unsure Danny on the path to becoming a superhero. Despite his flaws, he is good-hearted and loyal to his friends and family. He eventually grows, gaining great confidence in himself and maturity, and begins concentrating more on his heroic duties.

Danny possesses the powers of flight, intangibility, invisibility, sensing other spirits, and overshadowing, as well as ghost rays. The ghost rays consist of laser-like "ectoplasm" which are emitted from his body; primarily his hands and fingertips. Over the course of the show, he gains various other powers such as duplication, forcefield creation, telekinesis, power absorption, and cryokinesis. At the beginning of the series, his ghost sense is a facet of his power set that he must uncover. In the two-part special "The Ultimate Enemy," Danny gains a power known as the "ghostly wail." To use this power, Danny yells and creates waves of ecto-energy -illustrated much like sound waves- that destroy almost everything in his path, making it his most destructive and damaging power overall. However, since he obtained it 10 years too early, it drains him of all his strength and reverts him to human form.

Samantha "Sam" Manson
Voiced by Grey DeLisle

Sam Manson is one of Danny's best friends and love interest/eventual girlfriend. She is a gothic, environmentally-concerned "ultra-recyclo-vegetarian". Her parents are well-to-do social conservatives who inherited money from their famous inventor ancestor, who invented "the machine that twirls the cellophane around the toothpicks", though she briefly kept this a secret from her friends to avoid "fake friendships". In the Christmas special, it was revealed that she and her family are Jewish, which was hinted at the fact that her grandmother calls her "bubeleh".

Sam is often the most pragmatic of the group, but she can be bossy at times and is determined to stand up for what she believes in, particularly when environmental causes are involved. Like Danny, however, she is good-hearted, as she is always there for him no matter what. She was the one who urged Danny to explore the then-under-construction Fenton Portal, resulting in the accident that gave Danny his ghost powers. She has a crush on Danny that lasts throughout the majority of the series, and she eventually becomes his girlfriend.

Sam has also been unintentionally responsible in the development of ghosts and was transformed twice. In "Parental Bonding," when attempting to retrieve the Amulet of Aragon from Paulina to stop her from turning into a dragon, Paulina puts it on Sam as she tells him she only faked affection for Danny to get back at Sam for taunting her earlier, which infuriates Sam and transforms her into the ghost dragon, who Danny is able to defeat and change back. In the episode "Urban Jungle", Undergrowth brainwashes Sam into becoming his queen and "personal care taker of everything green". In the episode "Memory Blank", Sam accidentally causes Danny to lose his powers out of anger because of the wish-granting ghost Desiree and also brings to life three ghosts from a horror movie, Femalien, Terminatra, and Nightmerica.

Tucker Foley
Voiced by Rickey D'Shon Collins

Tucker Foley is an African-American boy who is Danny's other best friend "since forever". He is the most lighthearted of the trio and often cracks jokes, serving as the comic relief during very tense scenes. He often believes he is a ladies' man, but often fails at attracting any popular girls. Gifted with technological knowledge and a self-proclaimed "techno-geek", Tucker often helps by using his PDA to hack into computers and machinery. He is also a lover of meat, as opposed to Sam.

Despite all this (or, perhaps, because of it), Tucker has a shockingly dark side; he tends to get easily corrupted by his vice, and while he enjoys getting attention, he openly expresses envy when he is not receiving any.

Jasmine "Jazz" Fenton
Voiced by Colleen O'Shaughnessey

Jazz Fenton is Danny's intelligent and highly sociable sixteen-year-old sister. Viewing herself as the most rational and normal member of the family, Jazz often plays a surrogate parental role to Danny, thinking he's a naive child in need of guidance, unaware that she is often smothering him. Jazz is an overachiever, whose accomplishments unknowingly make Danny feel insignificant, under-appreciated, and stupid in comparison, making him feel like he has something to prove. Looking after her brother all her life has initially caused Jazz to think more like an adult then a teenager, unaware that Danny actually needs a big sister more than he needs a parent now that he's old enough to look after himself.

Due to her cherished goal of being a psychologist, Jazz has a bad habit of getting into people's personal space, which greatly annoys her brother, despite his knowing that she does it because she loves him and wants nothing more than to help him. When she secretly discovers her brother's secret identity, Jazz has made excuses for him while he went out to fight ghosts, and slowly starts to realize that her brother is growing up fine on his own. Along the way, she learns to appreciate her family's ghost hunting and actively takes part at times. She has also learned to embrace her sixteen-year-old self instead of acting like an "adult in a teen body", thanks to an "on-the-job" lesson on how to be a kid from Danny.

Jack and Madeline "Maddie" Fenton
Voiced by Rob Paulsen and Kath Soucie

Jack and Maddie are Danny and Jazz's parents. They are professional yet bumbling jumpsuit-wearing ghost hunters who make it their hobby and goal to study and eradicate "all things ectoplasmic." While they serve as much embarrassment to their children, they are just as well respected and loved by them. Despite their obsession with ghost hunting, Jack and Maddie are loving parents who dote on their kids constantly.

Jack is the most obsessed with ghost-hunting. He jumps into action before thinking and can make a bad situation even worse. While he can often act clumsy and incompetent, he holds a great deal of courage and is an adequate fighter, at one point clashing toe-and-toe against Vlad Plasmius and defeating him, much to the latter's surprise and embarrassment. He is a self-proclaimed scientist who has a good amount of technical knowledge, and is able to conjure up ghost gadgets and defense systems built all around the Fenton household. He also has a maturity and seriousness that few people recognize and can get serious and show great skill when danger threatens his loved ones. In Pt. 2 of the "Danny Phantom Ten Years Later" video on YouTube, Butch Hartman admits he partially based Jack off Fred Flintstone.

Maddie (short for Madeline) is an accomplished ninth-degree martial artist who serves as Jack's partner and equal inventor of Fenton anti-ghost gadgets. She dons a jumpsuit hood with goggles that makes her resemble Catwoman from DC comics and is more down-to-earth than her husband and often supports or keep her husband from getting into trouble or harm. She is often the more sensible of the two, but can be aggressive and snappy at times.

Jack and Maddie attended the University of Wisconsin-Madison at the same time as Vlad Plasmius; it was there that the rivalry between Jack and Vlad over Maddie began.

Villains

Ghost villains

Amorpho
Voiced by Danny Mann

Constituting a parody of the comics-character Chameleon, Amorpho is a ghost able to change his appearance into that of any (human or animal) being, at will. More mischievous than malevolent, he desires attention and pursues it by morphing into someone else's appearance, to play pranks that leave the corresponding person to take the consequences, for what he actually had done.

Bertrand 
Voiced by Jim Ward

Bertrand, is a small yet powerful shape-shifting, amorphous blob-like ghost who can transform into various monstrous creatures to defend Spectra and help enact her plans, and is just as sadistic and cruel as Spectra herself.

Box Ghost
Voiced by Rob Paulsen

The Box Ghost  is a running gag ghoul with a Canadian accent who constantly fights with cardboard and anything square (and the occasional bubble wrap). He is incompetent in his attempts to scare people and is barely taken seriously by either the heroes or the other ghosts. He was almost successful in taking over Amity Park by using Pandora's Box, but failed (in that episode, he was summed-up as 'a ghost with an inferiority complex, who just wants attention'). Despite it, Box Ghost remains determined regardless, shouting quotes such as "Beware, for I am the Box Ghost!" when approaching foes. In an alternate future portrayed in "The Ultimate Enemy", he is married to the Lunch Lady Ghost and has a daughter with her (Box Lunch).

Bullet
Voiced by Daran Norris

Bullet  is Walker's second-in-command. He is only seen in minor roles in two episodes.

Dark Danny/Dan Phantom
Voiced by Eric Roberts

Dark Danny Phantom, also known as Dan Phantom, is a villain created by the fusion of the ghost-halves of Danny and Vlad in an alternative timeline. He was created with the intent that Danny's worst enemy would be an evil version of himself. Dark Danny is a cruel, malicious ghost who cares little for anything other than himself, causing as much destruction as he sees fit.

Dark Danny, or Dan Phantom, came to be after a fatal and accidental explosion of the Nasty Burger Fast Food Restaurant's boiler that caused the explicit death of Danny Fenton's family, friends, and teacher. Grief-stricken and guilty, Danny moved in with Vlad Masters, feeling that only he could understand his pain. Danny asked Vlad to remove his emotions. Honoring the boy's wishes, Vlad separated Danny's human half from his ghost self; later, the latter retaliated doing the same to Vlad. The ghost-half of Danny then attempted to overshadow Plasmius, eventually fusing their bodies together. Plasmius's ghost-half overwhelmed that of Danny, creating an even more evil and more powerful version of the two halves. He then destroyed Vlad's entire castle, and his own human half.

He spent the next ten years destroying the world. Through time travel, the present-day Danny managed to defeat his evil self and subsequently sealed him in a Fenton Thermos.

Desiree

Voiced by Peri Gilpin

Desiree is a genie-like ghost who travels the world granting anyone's deepest desires. Unfortunately, while compelled to grant any wish she hears, she is free to interpret and twist it any way she sees fit. "So you have wished it, so shall it be!" is her sly response to a casual wish, with disastrous consequences that often serve to increase her powers. Her vindictive nature stems from her life as a human were many years back, she was a harem girl who won the affections of a sultan. He showered her with whatever gifts she wanted but was banished by the Sultan's jealous wife. She died of a broken heart (and old age), and returned as a genie/wishing ghost.

Ember McLain 

Voiced by Tara Strong, singing voice by Robbyn Kirmssé

Ember McLain is a power-hungry musician who hates authority. She thirsts for attention and has a cutting, sarcastic personality. She gains power when people say her name, as is shown in her first appearance when she attempted to gain power by performing her song "Remember" live and broadcasting worldwide in the hope that everyone would chant her name at the same time and empower her. She is somewhat similar to a siren, as she can also hypnotize her victims, using her guitar as her main mode of hypnotism as well as a weapon.

Ember is known for teaming up with other ghosts to show off her divine ghost powers. In the series, she has teamed up with Kitty, Penelope Spectra and Youngblood on several occasions, usually attacking authority in society. In the episode "Girls' Night Out" she is shown to be dating Skulker.

Femalien
Voiced by Grey DeLisle

Femalien is one of the fictional characters from the movie Trinity of Doom (a parody of Freddy vs. Jason). Femalien is a spoof of the villains from the film Predator. Femalien is brought to life by Desiree after Sam "wished" that something bad might happen to Paulina before her party. Femalien spends most of her time in the episode hunting down Paulina but attacks Danny when he is in the way. When asked who sent her (to kill Paulina) she says "Sam" before dissipating.

Fright Knight
Voiced by Michael Dorn

The Fright Knight is the representative of Halloween. He is a powerful, gruff knight who spreads terror from his winged horse, Nightmare. When touched by a victim, his sword, the Soul Shredder, is able to send that victim into the victim's worst nightmare imaginable.

Fright Knight remained a loyal servant to Pariah Dark, but showed reluctance to continue his servitude towards him. He later switches sides to Vlad Plasmius for reasons unknown.

Ghost Writer
Voiced by Will Arnett

The Ghost Writer is an author who resides in the Ghost Zone. He can create anything by simply typing on his keyboard with the added effect of forcing everyone to speak in rhymes, a situation that can continue even upon its destruction. An unassuming, but creative ghoul, he gained quick vindictiveness towards Danny Phantom when Danny accidentally destroyed his Christmas poem, but refused to apologize (as Danny did not enjoy Christmas). Breaking the Ghost Zone's Christmas Truce, Ghost Writer tormented Danny until he learned his lesson. He was later jailed for breaking the law.

Hotep-Ra
Voiced by S. Scott Bullock

Hotep-Ra is the mummy-like spirit of an ancient minion of King Duulamun, an Egyptian pharaoh who shares a remarkably similar appearance to Tucker Foley. He was released from his eternal sleep when Tucker looked into the mirror at the front of Ra's sarcophagus. He served Tucker and helped him regain his kingdom as pharaoh, but secretly planned to take over the kingdom once it was restored. Deceitful and sneaky, Hotep-Ra was eventually defeated by Tucker when he realized he had been used by Hotep-Ra.

Johnny 13
Voiced by William Baldwin

Johnny 13 is a rebellious biker. His living shadow brings bad luck to whoever it gains contact with. Always on the road, his constant companion is girlfriend Kitty. Despite their differences and Johnny's keen womanizing habits, they are in love with one another. Johnny spent the first time searching for a human host when Kitty was stuck between Ghost Portals and became jealous whenever Kitty would date someone else.

Never outrightly malicious, Johnny tends to leave Danny or anyone alone unless prompted otherwise.

Kitty
Voiced by Chynna Phillips

Kitty is Johnny 13's girlfriend. She is demanding and shrewish. She is constantly under dire stress over her loose boyfriend, wishing he'd focus his full attention on her. She has attempted to make him jealous and at several points, banished him to an alternate dimension via her ghostly ability to send any man to another dimension with a kiss. Despite it, the two remain in love with one another.

Lunch Lady Ghost 
Voiced by Patricia Heaton, later Kath Soucie

The Lunch Lady Ghost is the first major foe Danny encounters. She is very overweight and appears vowing revenge on Sam for making the school lunch menu vegetarian. She suffers from uncontrollable mood swings, turning suddenly from sweet and kind to violent and deadly. She consistently uses food (particularly meat) as her main form of weaponry. In an alternate future portrayed in "The Ultimate Enemy", she is married to the Box Ghost and has a daughter with him (Box Lunch).

Lydia
Voiced by Tara Strong

Lydia  is Freakshow's loyal ghost assistant. She is heavily covered with tattoos, which she can bring to life and control, and is most often seen shrouded in a cloak. She is seen apart from Freakshow in "Phantom Planet" as part of the crowd of ghosts which helps Danny in the end. Lydia is probably a reference to the song Lydia the Tattooed Lady, a signature tune of comedian Groucho Marx.

Medusa
Voiced by Grey DeLisle

Medusa is based on the character of Greek mythology of the same name. In "Boxed Up Fury", she is one of the obstacles Danny must get past to reach Pandora.

Nightmerica
Voiced by Grey DeLisle

Nightmerica is one of the fictional characters from the movie Trinity of Doom (a parody of Freddy vs. Jason). Nightmerica is a spoof of Freddy Krueger. Nightmerica is brought to life by Desiree after Sam "wished" that something bad might happen to Paulina before her party. Nightmerica spends most of her time in the episode hunting down Paulina. She is defeated by Sam after Danny lost his powers in the episode.

Nocturn
Voiced by James Garrett

Nocturn is the ghost of sleep and dreams. He carries a calm but mysterious air around him. Along with his army of Sleep Walkers, he travels the world, putting people to sleep and absorbing their dream energies to charge him up for world conquest. When he moves to conquer Amity Park, Danny, Tucker, Sam, and Jazz work together to defeat him after Danny manages to destroy the helmets he was using to keep people asleep.

Pariah Dark
Voiced by Brian Cox

Pariah Dark was the ruthless king of the Ghost Zone, until he was eventually captured by rebellious ghosts and sealed in the Sarcophagus of Forever Sleep, where he lay until Vlad accidentally awakened him. He immediately laid waste to both Amity Park and the Ghost Zone until Danny ultimately defeated him, using a power-enhancing suit to enhance his natural ghost powers beyond their usual limits.

Prince Aragon
Voiced by Dee Bradley Baker

Prince Aragon is the ruthless older brother of Princess Dorathea, the Dragon Ghost. Their family treasured two magical "Amulets of Aragon" that allow the wearer to transform into a dragon, especially when angry or distressed. Under his rule, his kingdom was lifeless and unhappy. He constantly treated his sister cruelly. Seeking a human bride to obtain what others do not have, Aragon set Dora to find him a bride. She eventually finds Sam Manson whom he almost marries if not for Danny's interference. Aragon is defeated by his sister when she gets the courage to dethrone and banish him she can disguise herself to resemble her old adult Young Princess Form called "Dora Mattingly" by using fake skin and shapeshifting abilities and powers.

Sidney Poindexter
Voiced by Peter MacNicol

Sidney Poindexter is a nerdy teenager from the 1950s. He was known as the most bullied student of Casper High and thus, holds a soft spot and great concern for those who suffered as much as he did. Stuffed into his locker many times, Sidney haunted it for around fifty years, leaving only a mirror behind, a gateway to the dimension that he's trapped in. Able to free himself after meeting Danny, Sidney antagonized Danny, believing him to be a bully when he catches Danny pulling a prank on Dash.

Poindexter took over Danny's body and used it to gain popularity while Danny became stuck in Sidney's body and world and was tormented daily. He managed to get Sam and Tucker to the mirror gateway where he proved he was the real Danny. Using trickery, the trio lured Sidney into his own mirror. He and Danny fought, regaining their own bodies in the process. He eventually gains freedom from his ghostly prison and a bit of popularity in the Ghost School inside the Ghost Zone.

Skulker
Voiced by Mathew St. Patrick, later Kevin Michael Richardson

Skulker introduces himself to Danny as the "Ghost Zone's greatest hunter". Skulker hunts down rare and unusual ghosts and has vowed to hunt down Danny for his rare half ghost status. He uses raw power and weaponry, but understands the way of the hunt, so he is able to utilize his brain to take advantage of his situation as predator to one-up his prey.
Having a sense of loyalty, he often works for Vlad Plasimus and occasionally serves as a "leader" and spokesperson for the ghosts. Skulker is actually a tiny green ghost inside a robotic suit. His girlfriend is Ember McLain. One running gag in the show is that since he has Tucker's PDA in his armor, while he has more power, he gets interrupted a few times into doing research on the purple back gorilla, much to his frustration. In an alternate timeline in "The Ultimate Enemy" he had combined with Technus to become "Skulktech 9.9", with Technus serving as Skulker's operating system.

Penelope Spectra
Voiced by Tara Strong

Penelope Spectra is a sadistic shadowy ghost who strives to retain a youthful and beautiful appearance. To do so, she often targets teenagers and through elaborate plans, slowly sucks them dry of their positive emotions like a kind of psychic vampire, using their worst fears and anxieties to humiliate and drain them, leaving them depressed and apathetic while she absorbs their energy to continuously strengthen and beautify her form. She retains a perky personality and chipper demeanor while hiding a dark, seductive and psychotic nature deep inside.

Terminatra
Voiced by Grey DeLisle

Terminatra is one of the fictional characters from the movie Trinity of Doom (a parody of Freddy vs. Jason). Terminatra is a spoof of the Terminator. Terminatra is brought to life by Desiree after Sam wished unknowingly that something bad should happen to Paulina before her party. Terminatra spends most of her time in the episode hunting down Paulina but attacks Danny when in the way. Before dissipating she says "Sam," implying that Sam sent her to hunt Paulina.

Nicolai Technus

Voiced by Rob Paulsen impersonating Gilbert Gottfried

Nicolai Technus, a spoof on the name of electrical inventor Nikola Tesla, commonly referred to as just Technus, is the self-proclaimed "Ghost Master of Science and Electrical Technology (and All Things Electronic and Beeping)". He has the ability to control and merge with all electrical technology, a supernatural power known as technopathy, as well as manipulate electricity. Technus is a boisterous genius mad scientist ghost who commonly shouts his name and goals, as well as blabber long speeches quite loudly (a common flaw which Danny exploits) Technus is also known for his use of out-dated slang, such as "hip" and "far out". He occasionally speaks in third-person when referring to himself. Technus later gains himself an upgrade after absorbing large amounts of electrical energy from an electronics store, a power plant, and the Fentons' van and house, rendering himself with a new look and upgraded ghostly form referred to as "Technus 2.0". In his upgraded 2.0 form, Technus doesn't shout out his secret plans as often, he is larger, taller and more powerful, sporting a black trench coat and long silver cape.

Undergrowth
Voiced by Mark Hamill

Undergrowth is a ghost who controls plants. Upset that his beloved nature has been torn down by human hands, he overtakes Amity Park, turns it into his own horticulture lair and possesses Sam, turning her into his "daughter" and the mother to his plants. Undergrowth was defeated by Danny when he mastered his ice powers with the help of Frostbite and used them to freeze him out of Amity Park.

Vlad Masters / Vlad Plasmius
Voiced by Martin Mull

Vlad Masters, or Vlad Plasmius is the archenemy of Danny. A rich, debonair billionaire, Vlad is a powerful half-ghost businessman and scientist whose twenty years of experience constantly one-up Danny's ghostly abilities. As the main antagonist in the series, he vows to destroy Jack for giving him his ghost powers, which in the process injured him terribly and put him in the hospital for seven years with a fatal condition known as "Ecto Acne". He wrongfully blamed this for ruining his life; however, it was his own evil plots that were the real product of his own personality flaws and refusal to accept that Maddie would never truly love him (the three had been classmates at the University of Wisconsin-Madison). He also has goals to obtain Danny as his son and, later, torment him after one too many rejections.

Vlad is a devious man whose exterior charm hides a manipulative interior. He is sneaky and often uses the people he knows as pawns to get what he wants. He remains clever and intelligent throughout the series. At the end of the series he reveals his ghost side in an attempt to secure world domination, but fails and is left as a wandering space nomad.

Originally devised as a vampire before the developers declared it "too occult", Vlad's current resemblance shares much in common with vampiric traits. His ghost surname, "Plasmius" is devised from "plasma" which doubly can be a reference to "blood" or ectoplasm - underlining both the former vampire element and the current 'ghost' connection. Regardless of its influence, it is a surname that stayed in the final production. However, writer Steve Marmel declared the name "Vlad Plasmius" was from a brick he bought in Lambeau Field.  Vlad's love for the Green Bay Packers and their linebacker Ray Nitschke is attributed and added due to Marmel's fondness for them. Their team color is a reverse gold and green to avoid copyright infringement with the actual team. An original running gag would be that Vlad would lose his manor due to unfortunate luck every other episode. In the "Danny Phantom 10 Years Later Part 2" YouTube video, Butch Hartman reveals there is a brick at Lambeau Field with Vlad's name on it.

Vortex
Voiced by Dave Boat

Vortex is a psychotic ghost with the power to control the weather, a gift he considers to be an art form. He finds Earth to be a meaningless planet, and has wrought havoc on it throughout the ages. On a trial by the Observants for his reckless behavior, Vortex is freed by Vlad who used him to his own services. However, Vortex rebels against Vlad and conjures up violent weather all over the world until Danny defeated him, gaining and losing Vortex's climate control powers. Vortex can generate and control storms, and the weather in general, from creating typhoons to making heat waves hot enough to melt walls, floods and winds cold enough to freeze streets in ice.

Walker
Voiced by James Arnold Taylor

Walker, a spoof on the name of the then-popular TV show Walker, Texas Ranger, is a very strict vigilante and warden who runs the prison of the Ghost Zone. He enjoys law and order and often commands with an iron fist; whoever so much as disobeys one rule from his law and rule book is in giant trouble. To justify his cause, he often makes up the rule as he abides by them and is not above using dirty measures to keep the Ghost Zone clean and corruption-free.

As an act of revenge for causing a riot in his prison and allowing prisoners to escape, Walker turned the entire city of Amity Park against Danny Phantom, forcing the ghost boy to endure the city's hatred until Pariah Dark's invasion reversed Danny's negative reputation.

Youngblood
Voiced by Taylor Lautner

Youngblood is a ghost with the appearance of a young child. Obnoxious and childish, he can only be seen by children. Despite his looks, Youngblood is a keen commander and skilled in battle. A ruthless prankster, Youngblood dresses up in various costumes, but most commonly portrays a pirate.

Human villains

Freakshow
Voiced by Jon Cryer

Freakshow (a parody of the Joker) is the ringmaster of the Circus Gothica, as well as the only fully human villain in the series. An entertainer for the Gothic audience, Freakshow is eccentric, full of showmanship and creativity. His family have used ghosts for their circus for years. Unsatisfied with just a showman's life, Freakshow used a magic scepter able to control ghosts and ordered them to steal goods. He went to Amity Park to make Danny Phantom a member of his performance. He succeeds briefly until Sam snaps him out of it and Danny destroys the scepter.

He is promptly jailed for his crimes. He escapes and uses the fabled Reality Gauntlet to bend reality to his whim, only to be outsmarted by Danny again. Danny successfully uses "Ghost Envy," Freakshow's jealousy of ghosts, against him and defeats him for good. Freakshow is mainly a spoof of the Ringmaster, but the Reality Gauntlet storyline makes him slightly a spoof of Thanos. His full name is Frederich Isak Showenhower.

The Guys in White
Voiced by Dee Bradley Baker, S. Scott Bullock, Jim Ward, and Kevin Michael Richardson

Operative K, Operative O, Operative L, Operative M and Agent Alpha are members of a secret governmental organization  whose goal is to eliminate all ghosts and other paranormal beings on Earth. They wear white suits, black gloves, earpieces and black sunglasses as their primary uniform. Colloquially referred to as The Guys in White (spoofing the Men In Black), they are usually represented by Operatives K and O, who are tasked with capturing Danny Phantom. They are often incompetent and frequently bicker amongst themselves. They are highly prepared for any task, almost to the point of paranoia. A recurring gag is that, despite their immense dedication and resources, they always fail in capturing Danny. At one point, Danny asks why they are hunting him, to which they respond that while they are aware that he's good-hearted and has good intentions, he is also too powerful and dangerous to walk freely.

Masters' Blasters
Voiced by Colleen O'Shaughnessey, Dee Bradley Baker, and Rob Paulsen

Vid, Thrash, and Download are a trio of teen ghost hunters, created by Vlad to shame Danny and dethrone him as resident savior of Amity Park. They embodied everything that is radical and are often greedy, frequently demanding payment for their services from citizens. The Blasters are later betrayed by their employer when he reveals himself to be a half-ghost.

Valerie Gray

Voiced by Grey DeLisle (first voice), Colleen O'Shaughnessey (second voice), Cree Summer (third voice)

Valerie Gray is the series' main anti-heroine. Once a popular shallow girl, Valerie's life takes a turn for the worse when accidents caused by Cujo the ghost dog cost her father his job. Her mother is never seen or mentioned, probably because she and Valerie's father are divorced or she died. No longer living an average life, Valerie vowed revenge against all ghosts for ruining her life after being given a ghost hunting suit and gears from Vlad (unbeknownst to her at the time) Vlad employs her to do his bidding until she finds out that Vlad was a half-ghost and that he was manipulating her. She is hot-tempered, which often clouds her judgment, but slowly starts to realize a world beyond the superficial. She briefly strikes a romance with Danny Fenton, but clashes very often with his alter-ego.

Ghost allies

Clockwork
Voiced by David Carradine

Clockwork is an immortal being who controls and keeps the flow of time. He is calm, tricky, and all-knowing. When asked by the Observants to kill Danny Fenton to prevent a future where his evil self wrecks the planet, Clockwork seemingly appears to be Danny's enemy. In reality, he is merely helping and urging him to make the right decisions so that he can prevent Danny's death by the Observants. Neutral, he does not fulfill every wish Danny desires, including altering past events. He only adjusts time as he sees fit, usually to teach Danny a lesson. He constantly changes his age and appearance from a child to adult to old man, which refers to his detachment from the time sequence. He currently owns the Fenton Thermos that contains Dark Danny.

Dairy King
Voiced by S. Scott Bullock

The Dairy King is a ghost that used to live in Vlad Masters's mansion and now haunts it. The Dairy King is one of the first nice ghosts Danny meets, and all he wants is to be left alone. The Dairy King wears a crown with a large cheese under it. He has white hair and a white mustache. He wears a red robe and has a staff with ice cream on it.

Danielle "Dani" Phantom
Voiced by AnnaSophia Robb, later Krista Swan 

Dani Phantom, also known as Danielle Phantom,  is an imperfect clone of Danny Phantom, created by Vlad as a stepping stone to the perfect Danny clone. In her debut, Dani poses as Danny's cousin. Only one step behind him, Danielle's body is slowly-dissolving, but retains free will. She first works with Vlad until Danny convinces Danielle that she is nothing but a tool to Vlad. With that knowledge, she sides with Danny. She shares many of the same traits and interests as Danny, who serves as something of an older brother to her. In another episode, Danny and Valerie come to help her when she was captured by Vlad. She becomes stabilized by an invention Danny uses and after saying goodbye to them, flies off to parts unknown. The last time she is seen in the series is as part of the crowd of ghosts in "Phantom Planet". Butch Hartman has stated that sometime after the events of "Phantom Planet", Danielle's existence and origins were revealed to the rest of the Fentons, who subsequently opted to adopt her, making her Jack and Maddie's youngest daughter and child, and Danny and Jazz's younger sister; Hartman has also stated that this would have been shown on-screen had the show gotten a fourth season.

Frostbite
Voiced by Bob Joles

Frostbite  is a jovial yeti-like ghost. He lives in the Far Frozen with his people, where they worship Danny Phantom for his defeat over Pariah Dark. He serves as a mentor figure to Danny and ultimately teaches him how to hone his ice powers. His people hold the Infi-Map, a map that can find any natural Ghost Portals.

Cujo
Voiced by S. Scott Bullock

The Ghost Dog, nicknamed "Cujo," is a playful ghost puppy. When angered, it can grow into a large, aggressive beast. In search for its squeaky toy, the ghost dog trashes the Axion Labs, costing Damon Gray, Valerie Gray's father, his job. This causes Valerie to vow a vendetta against all ghosts. After finding its toy, it disappeared. It does show up to visit Danny from time to time.

Pandora
Voiced by April Stewart

Pandora is the creator and owner of "Pandora's Box". When Danny was powerless to stop the Box Ghost from creating havoc with the box, he entered her lair and asked her help in retrieving it back. She is a benevolent ghost who keeps the world less evil by keeping many malicious contents within her box, but can get aggressive when tampered with. She shares her name with the first woman from classical mythology.

Princess Dorathea
Voiced by Grey DeLisle, later Susan Blakeslee

Princess Dora is a beautiful princess whose magical amulet causes her to transform into a dragon. She is the younger sister of Prince Aragon. When she first emerged from the Ghost Zone, her despair over not being allowed to go the Princess ball by her mother caused her to turn into a dragon and fight Danny. The battle caused her to lose the amulet, which was worn by Paulina and later Sam, and caused both of them to turn into the ghost dragon. She later made a cameo in "Prisoners of Love," briefly chasing Sam and Tucker. Dora later appeared alongside the many ghosts fleeing Pariah Dark's army in "Reign Storm." Later she would return to the human world at the behest of her brother, Prince Aragon, who ordered her to seek out a human bride for him. She did so disguised as "Dora Mattingly," a beauty pageant organizer, and abducted Sam due to Danny inadvertently naming her winner of a beauty contest her. Due to the traditional role of a princess in her time, she was initially subservient to Aragon, but Sam later helped her realize that she had the power to fight against him, and she overthrew and banished her older brother with Danny's help.

Wulf
Voiced by Dee Bradley Baker

Wulf is a bipedal wolf ghost, constantly on the run from Walker as an escaped prisoner. He has the ability to go into both the Earth and the Ghost Zone at will by slashing through dimensions with his claws. Wulf retains a loyal streak and was quick to befriend and trust Danny when he helped him. In return, he sacrificed his first freedom to save Danny (by ensuring a blast meant for Danny actually hit Walker, who Wulf was holding onto at the time). They eventually reunite where Danny helps him a second time and secures his freedom.

Despite Tucker's claim that Wulf speaks Esperanto, in most cases it is easy to see that he speaks Esperanto words with English word order, such as using the phrase "al meti" to mean "to put," equating the Esperanto preposition "al" with the English infinitive marker "to".

Other ghosts

Klemper
Voiced by S. Scott Bullock

Klemper is a ghost seen in pajamas. He is desperate to get a friend, and continually asks "Will you be my friend?" If the subject denies him this, he turns violent and often uses an ice attack on the subject.

The Observants 
Voiced by Dee Bradley Baker and Phil Morris

The Observants are a group of one-eyed ghost beings whose job is to observe the sequence of events in time. They are confined to viewing time in a linear manner, whereas their colleague Clockwork can view time in a multifaceted manner. In their first appearance, they are seen convincing Clockwork to prevent the creation of Dark Danny in the future, which they see as an inevitable event in their view of time, by destroying Danny Phantom in the present. Clockwork sidesteps this plan and helps Danny to destroy his evil self. They are also seen placing Vortex on trial in a later episode.

Recurring humans
 Mr. Lancer (Ron Perlman) is the vice-principal and English, Math, Science and History teacher of Casper High. He is a very strict and stern teacher who tends to call out Danny because of his average grades and his lackluster interest in his job, but is also a well-meaning man who tries to make sure all his students do their best. He has a humorous habit of shouting out book titles when he is shocked or surprised in place of swear words. He also constantly tries to be "cool" by saying some rather tired "hip phrases". In the first two seasons, he acts very antagonistic to the point of often favoring the popular kids, but in the third season he acts very serious and caring. He also used to be a male cheerleader when he attended Casper High. His personality in the series is similar to that of Seymour Skinner from The Simpsons and Mr. Mackey from South Park.
 Dash Baxter (S. Scott Bullock) is the most popular boy in Casper High School. The star football quarterback and a basketball player, he often gets free leeway from the authorities at school due to his winning streak. However, Dash is a bully who frequently picks on Danny and anyone else smaller and less popular than himself. As an act of irony, his role model is Danny Phantom. His role in the series is similar to that of the Spider-Man character Flash Thompson and his personality is very similar to that of Kevin from Ed Edd n Eddy. He makes a cameo in The Fairly OddParents episode, "Fly Boy"(voiced by Jason Marsden).
 Paulina Sanchez (Maria Canals-Barrera) is a 15-year-old Hispanic-American cheerleader and the most popular girl at Casper High School as well as Danny's crush for most of the series. She is beautiful yet self-centered, devious, and as Sam puts it, "a dime a dozen". Paulina has a crush on  Danny Phantom after he saved her (frequently referring to him as "Inviso-Bill"), but could not care less for his alter ego, who had a crush on her during the first half of the series. In 2017, series creator Butch Hartman confirmed in a YouTube video, "107 Facts about Danny Phantom," that Paulina's last name is Sanchez.
 Kwan (Dat Phan, later James Sie) is an Asian-American football player and Dash's best friend. Though he is popular and bullies the lesser known students as much as Dash, Kwan is a bit more reluctant. He possibly only wanted popularity so that he can feel a sense of belonging.
 Star (Grey DeLisle, later Tara Strong) is another popular girl and cheerleader at Casper High who is Kwan's girlfriend and Paulina's best friend and also serves as her "satellite", constantly orbiting around her. She is maliciously blunt. She and Valerie are good friends.
 Mikey (Dee Bradley Baker) is a small nerd in Casper High who is often the victim of the popular boys' bullying.
 Nathan (Dee Bradley Baker) is another small nerd who is interested in Valerie. He was renamed Lester in “Claw of the Wild”.
 Jeremy (S. Scott Bullock) and Pamela "Pam" Manson (Laraine Newman) are Sam's parents and the overall antithesis of their daughter, being a pair of super-optimistic socialites. They possess an enormous disdain of Sam's nonconformity and constantly try to steer her away from it. The Mansons have a rivalry with the Fenton parents.
 Damon Gray (Phil Morris) is Valerie's father and faithful employee of Axion Labs until he was briefly fired. He is a calm, patient man who adores his daughter, but once he finds out about it, does not approve of her ghost fighting job.
 Tiffany Snow (Tara Strong) is a reporter who remains cheery despite the often depressing news she delivers.
 Lance Thunder (Dee Bradley Baker) is a weatherman who has reported about Ghosts several times. He constantly fidgets over his hair, and when he thinks he is off the air, argues with the fact that he has to be the one to report.
 Principal Ishiyama (June Angela) is the Asian-American female principal of Casper High.

References

Danny Phantom
Danny Phantom
Danny Phantom
Danny Phantom